KLGZ (1600 AM) is a radio station broadcasting a country music format. Licensed to serve Algona, Iowa, United States, the station is owned by A2Z Broadcasting and features programming from ABC Radio. Prior to Country music, KLGZ had an Adult Contemporary format, simulcasting its sister station, KLGA-FM. KLGZ began broadcasting in 1956 as KLGA, a daytime-only station, and added nighttime power at a later date.

KLGA changed its call sign to the current KLGZ on July 15, 2014.

FM Translator
KLGZ relays programming to an FM translator in order to widen the coverage area and also to provide listeners with the stereophonic high fidelity sound of FM.  KLGZ (AM) uses a two tower antenna array which orients the signal to the northwest; the fm translator uses a non-directional pattern.

References

External links

LGZ
Riverfront Broadcasting LLC